U.S. Route 60 (US 60) is an east–west United States Highway within New Mexico. It begins at the Arizona state line and continues east to the Texas state line.

Route description
US 60 enters New Mexico in Catron County east of Springerville, Arizona. The road makes an arc through Catron County, with the apex at Quemado, avoiding Apache-Sitgreaves National Forest and Escondido Mountain.

Between the divide and Datil, US 60 cuts through Cibola National Forest. In Datil, US 60 serves as the eastern terminus of New Mexico State Road 12 (NM 12).

East of Datil, US 60 traverses the northern end of the Plains of San Augustin, then crosses the county line into Socorro County. The road bisects the Very Large Array complex and a track used in rearranging the antennas that make up the Array crosses the highway. Some  into the county, the highway passes through Magdalena.

It then enters the county seat of Socorro, where it meets Interstate 25 (I-25). US 60 heads north, running concurrently with the Interstate.

Most of the route of US 60 from Abo Canyon to the Texas line parallels the Southern Transcon of the Atchison, Topeka and Santa Fe Railway. It turns back eastward, rising through Abo Pass at the southern end of the Manzano Mountains before crossing into Torrance County and passing through Mountainair, where it intersects NM 55. After passing through Willard, it sets out across the Pedernal Hills. In Encino, it begins a concurrency with US 285. Just after crossing into Guadalupe County, US 54 joins the concurrency. The three highways pass through Vaughn and then go their separate ways; US 285 heads southeast towards the direction of Roswell, US 54 heads northeast towards both Santa Rosa and I-40, and US 60 heads east towards Clovis.

US 60 angles southeast toward Yeso, entering De Baca County en route. Curving back towards the east, the road enters Fort Sumner, the county seat,  later. Just west of town, it serves as the northern terminus of NM 20, and in Fort Sumner proper, it overlaps US 84, which will persist until just before the Texas border. East of town the two highways encounter NM 212, a spur to Fort Sumner State Monument, and NM 252 in Taiban.

US 60/US 84 passes through Tolar near the De Baca–Roosevelt county line. The two routes do not stay in Roosevelt County for long, however, proceeding into Curry County west of Melrose. The highways pass through Melrose, St. Vrain, and Grier before widening out to a four-lane highway as they approach Clovis, the Curry County seat. In Clovis, the home of Cannon Air Force Base, the highways meet up with US 70, which joins the concurrency. The three highways proceed through Texico, and just before the Texas state line, US 60 leaves the concurrency and heads northeast while US 70/US 84 continues eastward.

For the distance of more than 300 miles (480 km) between Abo Pass and Amarillo, the highway parallels the Southern Transcon, one of the busiest transcontinental railroads in the west.

Major intersections

References

60
 New Mexico
Transportation in Catron County, New Mexico
Transportation in Socorro County, New Mexico
Transportation in Torrance County, New Mexico
Transportation in De Baca County, New Mexico
Transportation in Roosevelt County, New Mexico
Transportation in Curry County, New Mexico